Giuseppe Falcomatà (born 18 September 1983) is an Italian politician.

Biography
Giuseppe Falcomatà is the youngest child of Italo Falcomatà (1943–2001), former mayor of Reggio and promoter of the Reggio Spring movement. He attended a high school in Reggio. In 2006, he graduated from the Mediterranea University of Reggio Calabria with a degree in Law. He has been a practicing lawyer since 2010.

He has held public offices since 2007. In 2011, he was elected to Reggio Calabria's city council.

On 6 July 2014, he won his party's nomination for the mayor of Reggio Calabria. He won the mayoral election on 26 October 2014, with 60.99% of the vote.

Works

References

Mayors of Reggio Calabria
1983 births
Living people
People from Reggio Calabria